Monique Schwitter (born 2 March 1972) is a Swiss writer and actress.

Life and career

Schwitter was born in Zürich, Switzerland. She studied stage direction and theater at the Mozarteum Salzburg from 1993 to 1997. Having graduated, she worked as an actress at top-level houses for five years, such as the Schauspielhaus Zürich, the Schauspiel Frankfurt, and Schauspielhaus Graz. She was then an ensemble member at the Deutsches Schauspielhaus in Hamburg. Throughout that period, she was a reciter, a dubbing actor and directed and produced several literary features about Peter Handke, Ernst Jandl, Raymond Queneau, and Sarah Kane. At the Deutsche Schauspielhaus she curated a literary salon and performed as a blues singer. In her acting career, she regularly was part of numerous theater festivals, such as Mülheimer Theatertagen (1999), "Reich und Berühmt" in Berlin (2001), "Theater der Welt" in Stuttgart (2005), Vienna Festival (2006), Salzburg Festival (2006), "Theaterformen" in Hannover (2007) und Berliner Theatertreffen (2008).

Starting 2002, she contributed prose and short stories in various literary magazines. After the editor Alfred Kolleritsch had become interested in her work, she published much of her early work in the Austrian literary magazine Manuskripte. Her first collection of short stories, Wenn's schneit beim Krokodil, was published in 2005 and was awarded the Robert-Walser Preis (2006) and a prize by the Deutsche Schillerstiftung. In 2008, the theater Lucerne comissed the piece Himmels-W, which premiered there on April 3, 2008. In the same year, she was invited to participate in the Max-Frisch-Symposium at the University Brussels. Her debut novel Ohren haben keine Lider was also released in 2008 and was translated into Chinese in 2010 for the Expo in Shanghai. Her second volume of short stories, Goldfish Memory, was launched in 2011. In 2010, Monique Schwitter decided to end her acting career, in order to pursue writing full-time.

Nominated by Hildegard Elisabeth Keller, she took part at the Festival of German-Language Literature (Ingeborg-Bachmann-Prize) in 2015. Her novel Eins im Andern was short listed for the German Book Prize and received the Swiss Book Prize (. The novel is about a forty-year-old woman who during a random google search discovers that her first love had committed suicide many years ago. Learning this, she recounts the biography of her love life by telling the story of twelve previous lovers. In 2016, it was awarded the Swiss Literary Prize.

Her work has been translated into several languages, including French, Danish, Italian, Dutch, Chinese, Russian, Polish, and English.

Schwitter lives in Hamburg.

Published works
 Wenn's schneit beim Krokodil. Short Stories. Literaturverlag Droschl, Graz 2005, .
 Ohren haben keine Lider. Novel. Residenz, Salzburg 2008, .
 Himmels-W. Theater piece 2008.
 Goldfischgedächtnis. Short Stories. Literaturverlag Droschl, Graz 2011, .
 Goldfish Memory Cardigan:Parthian 2015
 Eins im Andern. Novel. Literaturverlag Droschl, Graz 2015, .

Awards
 2001: Nestroy-Nomination, best young actor for the role of Mariedl in Die Präsidentinnen by Werner Schwab
 2003: Nestroy-Nomination, best young actor for performing Janis Joplin and Marie in Woyzeck by Georg Büchner
 2004: Hermann-Lenz-Stipendium
 2005: Preis der Marianne und Curt Dienemann-Stiftung
 2006: Robert-Walser-Preis
 2006: Förderpreis der Schweizerischen Schillerstiftung
 2011: Rotahorn Literaturpreis
 2012: Aufenthalts-Stipendium der Sparte Literatur im Künstlerhaus Lauenburg
 2015: Schweizer Buchpreis, for Eins im Andern
 2016: Stipendium des Heinrich-Heine-Hauses der Stadt Lüneburg
 2016: Schweizer Literaturpreis

References

External links
 
 
 
 

1972 births
Living people
Swiss women novelists
20th-century Swiss actresses
21st-century Swiss novelists
Actors from Zürich
21st-century Swiss women writers
Swiss Book Prize winners